Rose of Sharon is a name that has been applied to several different species of flowering plants that are valued in different parts of the world. It is also a biblical expression, though the identity of the plant referred to is unclear and is disputed among biblical scholars. In neither case does it refer to actual roses, although one of the species it refers to in modern usage is a member of [[Rosaceae 
]]. The deciduous flowering shrub known as the rose of Sharon is a member of the mallow family which is distinct from the family Rosaceae. The name's colloquial application has been used as an example of the lack of precision of common names, which can potentially cause confusion. "Rose of Sharon" has become a frequently used catch phrase in poetry and lyrics.

Biblical origins
The name "Rose of Sharon" first appears in Hebrew in the Tanakh. In the Shir Hashirim ('Song of Songs' or 'Song of Solomon') 2:1, the speaker (the beloved) says "I am the rose of Sharon, a rose of the valley". The Hebrew phrase  (ḥăḇaṣṣeleṯ haššārōn) was translated by the editors of the King James version of the Bible as "rose of Sharon"; however, previous translations had rendered it simply as "the flower of the field" (Septuagint "", Vulgate "", Wycliffe "a flower of the field"). Contrariwise, the Hebrew word ḥăḇaṣṣeleṯ occurs two times in the scriptures: in the Song, and in Isaiah 35:1, which reads, "the desert shall bloom like the rose." The word is translated "rose" in the King James version, but is rendered variously as "lily" (Septuagint "", Vulgate "", Wycliffe "lily"), "jonquil" (Jerusalem Bible) and "crocus" (RSV).

Varying scholars have suggested that the biblical "rose of Sharon" may be one of the following plants:

A crocus: "a kind of crocus growing as a lily among the brambles" ("Sharon", Harper's Bible Dictionary) or a crocus that grows in the coastal plain of Sharon (New Oxford Annotated Bible);
A tulip: "a bright red tulip-like flower ... today prolific in the hills of Sharon" "rose", Harper's Bible Dictionary);
Tulipa agenensis, the Sharon tulip, a species of tulip suggested by a few botanists or
Tulipa montana
A lily: Lilium candidum, more commonly known as the Madonna lily, a species of lily suggested by some botanists, though likely in reference to the lilies of the valley mentioned in the second part of Song of Solomon 2:1.
Narcissus ("rose", Cyclopaedia of Biblical, Theological and Ecclesiastical Literature)

According to an annotation of Song of Solomon 2:1 by the translation committee of the New Revised Standard Version, "rose of Sharon" is a mistranslation of a more general Hebrew word for crocus.

Etymologists have tentatively linked the biblical  to the words  beṣel, meaning 'bulb', and  ḥāmaṣ, which is understood as meaning either 'pungent' or 'splendid' (The Analytical Hebrew and Chaldee Lexicon).

A possible interpretation for the biblical reference is Pancratium maritimum, which blooms in the late summer just above the high-tide mark. Some identify this flower with the "rose of Sharon" mentioned in the Song of Songs, but not all scholars accept this.

Recently, some scholars have translated ḥăḇaṣṣeleṯ as "a budding bulb" in consideration of the genealogical research of multilingual versions and lexicons.

Modern usage

The name "rose of Sharon" is also commonly applied to several plants, all originating outside the Levant and not likely to have been the plant from the Bible:
Hypericum calycinum (also called Aaron's beard due to its net-veined underside and numerous yellow stamens), an evergreen flowering shrub native to southeast Europe and southwest Asia
Hibiscus syriacus, a deciduous flowering shrub native to east Asia, and the national flower of South Korea (also known as "Mugunghwa" and "Althea")
Hibiscus rosa-sinensis (var. 'Vulcan'), the national flower of Malaysia

The term is also applied to varieties of iris, Malus domestica and Paeonia lactiflora.

References

Sources

Plant common names
Biblical phrases
Plants in the Bible